Haementeria officinalis is a species of leeches found in Mexico. Its salivary glands produce the protein antistasin, which prevents blood clotting by inhibiting factor Xa.

See also
 Direct factor Xa inhibitor

References

Leeches